Elvin Ramírez Rodriguez (born October 10, 1987) is a Dominican former professional baseball pitcher. He played in Major League Baseball (MLB) for the New York Mets.

Career
Ramírez was signed as an international free agent by the New York Mets in 2004. He was selected by the Washington Nationals in the Rule 5 draft before the 2011 season. He was placed on the 60-day disabled list to begin the season. He was returned to the Mets on October 18. The Mets promoted Ramírez to the majors on June 1, 2012. On March 27, 2013 the Mets traded Ramirez to the Angels for cash considerations. He signed a minor league deal with the Pittsburgh Pirates on December 18, 2013. The Pirates released Ramírez in March 2014. He signed a minor league deal with the Cincinnati Reds in April 2014 and was released by the Reds in August 2014.

On June 27, 2017, Ramirez signed with the Bridgeport Bluefish of the Atlantic League of Professional Baseball.

On November 1, 2017, Ramirez was drafted by the Long Island Ducks in the Bridgeport Bluefish dispersal draft. He became a free agent after the 2017 season. 

On April 13, 2018, Ramirez was traded to the New Britain Bees of the Atlantic League of Professional Baseball. He became a free agent following the 2018 season.

See also
Rule 5 draft results

References

External links

1987 births
Living people
Arkansas Travelers players
Binghamton Mets players
Bridgeport Bluefish players
Buffalo Bisons (minor league) players
Dominican Republic expatriate baseball players in Mexico
Dominican Republic expatriate baseball players in the United States
Dominican Summer League Mets players
Gigantes del Cibao players
Kingsport Mets players
Leones del Escogido players
Louisville Bats players
Major League Baseball players from the Dominican Republic
Mexican League baseball pitchers
New York Mets players
Pensacola Blue Wahoos players
Salt Lake Bees players
Savannah Sand Gnats players
St. Lucie Mets players
Sultanes de Monterrey players
Toros del Este players
New Britain Bees players